Connecticut held its election September 19, 1814.

See also 
 United States House of Representatives elections, 1814 and 1815
 List of United States representatives from Connecticut

Notes

References 

1814
Connecticut
United States House of Representatives